{{Infobox school district
|name = Great Falls Public Schools
|logo = 
|motto = Great Falls. Great Schools. Greater Tomorrow.
|type = Public School District
|budget = $100 million (2010-2011)
|established = 1886
|superintendent = Thomas G. Moore, M.A.
|schools = 21 (2010-2011)

Current schools
As of the 2014-2015 school year, the district operated the following public schools:

Pre-School
 ELF (Early Learning Family) Center at Skyline School (opened 1970)

Elementary schools
 Chief Joseph Elementary School (1962)
 Lewis and Clark Elementary School (1953)
 Lincoln Elementary School (1951)
 Longfellow Elementary School (1952)
 Loy Elementary School (1963)
 Meadow Lark Elementary School (1960)
 Morningside Elementary School (1960)
 Mountain View Elementary School (1970)
 Riverview Elementary School (1960)
 Roosevelt Elementary School (opened 1928)
 Sacajawea Elementary School (1962)
 Sunnyside Elementary School (opened 1960)
 Valley View Elementary School (1960)
 West Elementary School (formerly West Junior High School; 1952)
 Whittier Elementary School (opened 1886; current building dates to 1938)
 Giant Springs Elementary School (opened 2017-2018)
Middle schools
 East Middle School (opened fall 1958)
 North Middle School (1970)

High schools
 C.M. Russell High School (opened fall 1965)
 Great Falls High School (opened fall 1930)
 Paris Gibson Alternative High School (built 1950; opened fall 1975)

Former schools
Former schools (and their current uses as of 2015), include:
 Great Falls High School (1400 1st Avenue North), opened November 1896, was renamed Paris Gibson Junior High School in 1931, and closed in 1975.
 McKinley Elementary School (1601 6th Avenue North) opened in 1906 and closed in 1979.
 Hawthorne/Collins Elementary School (2000 Smelter Avenue NE in Black Eagle) opened in 1909 and closed in 1979.
 Washington Elementary School (1015 1st Avenue North) opened in 1909 and closed in 1970.
 Franklin Elementary School (820 1st Avenue SW) opened in 1913 to serve Native American children and closed in 1979.
 Emerson Elementary School (1220 3rd Avenue South) opened in 1916 and closed in 1973.
 Largent Elementary School, originally Junior High School (915 1st Avenue South), was completed in 1918 and used as a junior high school, became an elementary school in 1930, and closed in 1973.
 Lowell Elementary School (3117 5th Avenue North) opened in 1939 and closed in 1979.
 C.M. Russell Elementary School, formerly the Sun River Valley School (2615 Central Avenue West), opened in 1932 and closed in 1986.

Great Falls Public Schools Foundation
The Great Falls Public Schools Foundation (GFPSF) was established in 2010 by the Great Falls Public Schools to act as the community recipient for donations made to the public school system. The foundation's goal is to establish a permanent fund that can support both the most disadvantaged and neediest students in the school system, as well as provide enhanced education, rewards, and opportunities for high-achieving students and educators.

In November 2016, the GFPSF received a $1 million from the Astrin family of Great Falls. Local physician Charles Astrin and his wife, Judy, made the bequest in memory of their daughter, Jennifer, a 1992 graduate of C.M. Russell High School who died in a vehicular accident in 1993. The Astrin donation established a $1,500-a-year higher education scholarship for a financially disadvantaged student at C.M. Russell High School, Great Falls High School, and Paris Gibson Education Center. Each scholarship is renewable for four years. The Astrin donation also funded a $10,000 annual grant to support students in dual-credit classes. The Astrin bequest was the largest donation the GFPSF history.

References
Notes

Citations

Bibliography
Robison, Ken. Cascade County and Great Falls. Mount Pleasant, S.C.: Arcadia Publishing, 2011.
Small, Lawrence F. Religion in Montana: Pathways to the Present. Billings, Mont.: Rocky Mountain College, 1992.
Superintendent of Public Instruction. Biennial Report of the Superintendent of Public Instruction. Vol. II. Montana Department of Public Instruction. Helena, Mont.: Independent Publishing Co., 1903.
Yingst, Lonnie. "Better Decisions Without the Surprises: Communication as the Key to the Principal-Superintendent Relationship." In The Changing Relationship Between Principal and Superintendent: Shifting Roles in an Era of Educational Reform. Rebeca van der Bogert, ed. San Francisco: Jossey-Bass, 1999.

School districts in Montana
Great Falls, Montana
Education in Cascade County, Montana
School districts established in 1886